Allamanda cathartica, commonly called golden trumpet, common trumpetvine, and yellow allamanda, is a species of flowering plant of the genus Allamanda in the family Apocynaceae. It is native to Brazil. This plant is cited in Flora Brasiliensis by Carl Friedrich Philipp von Martius.

It does not twine, nor does it have tendrils or aerial roots. It can be pruned into a shrub form. If not pruned it can sprawl to a height of 20 feet.

The city of Canóvanas, Puerto Rico has adopted this species, known locally as canario amarillo, as its official flower.

Cultivation
The species is cultivated as a house plant. It requires a soil rich in organic matter, temperatures of not less than  during the growing season, plenty of moisture, and bright light but not direct sunlight. Propagation is by cuttings taken from April to May.

Gallery

References

External links
 Flora Brasiliensis: Allamanda cathartica

cathartica
Flora of Brazil
Poisonous plants